Carey Saheber Munshi is a Bengali historical drama film directed by Bikash Roy based on a novel of the same name by Pramathanath Bishi. This film was released on 20 January 1961 under the banner of Bikas Roy Productions Private Limited.

Plot
The movie revolves with a historic story of British India. The protagonist of the film is Ramram Basu who is the manager (or munshi) of William Carey, a Churchman come from  England. Ramram, a man of modern thoughts faces serious problems to spread education among the Bengali people. But his fight is going on against cruel customs, rituals of Bengal.

Cast
 Chhabi Biswas
 Manju Dey
 Pahari Sanyal
 Tulsi Chakraborty
 Bikash Roy
Kali Banerjee
 Nitish Mukhopadhyay
 Tandra Burman
 Amit Dey

References

1961 films
Bengali-language Indian films
1960s Bengali-language films
Indian drama films
Indian black-and-white films
Films based on Indian novels
Indian feudalism
1961 drama films